CofS may refer to:

Chief of Staff
Church of Scientology
Church of Scotland
COFS syndrome, a rare and fatal autosomal recessive neurodegenerative disorder

See also
COF (disambiguation)
CoFSM or Flying Spaghetti Monster